This is a list of supermarket chains in the Netherlands. On 1 January 2022 there were 6.390 supermarkets in the Netherlands. A 4.4 percent increase over the previous year (2021). In number of stores, Albert Heijn is the largest supermarket chain in the Netherlands followed by Jumbo and PLUS.

Current

brick and mortar and optionally online

Online only

Defunct

References 

Netherlands
Supermarkets